St. Peter's Episcopal Church is a historic church at Rector and Gordon Streets in Perth Amboy, Middlesex County, New Jersey. It is the oldest Episcopal parish in New Jersey and contains the oldest extant gravestone in New Jersey. The church building, built from 1849 to 1852 in Gothic style, was added to the National Register of Historic Places on May 12, 1977 for its significance in religion.

History
The congregation was organized in 1680 when 12 Church of England communicants designated themselves the Congregation of St. Peter's Episcopal Church. They erected a church using the foundation of an abandoned courthouse. That site is not far from the current church. In 1706, Anne, Queen of Great Britain presented the parish with a set of communion silver that is still extant.

They received a royal charter in 1718 from George I of Great Britain.

The second building on the site was built in 1722 and was destroyed by a fire.

In 1770 Governor William Franklin was a vestryman in the congregation.

During the American Revolution colonial soldiers built a redoubt behind the church to defend town against attacks from the British and Loyalist troops across the Arthur Kill in Staten Island.

The first black man to vote in America, Thomas Mundy Peterson, was a member of the church and was buried in the church graveyard. He voted in the Perth Amboy, New Jersey mayoral election on March 31, 1870. That was one day after adoption of the 15th Amendment to the United States Constitution.

Graveyard
Helen Gordon (1660-1687) was the wife of Thomas Gordon of Scotland; she died December 12, 1687, aged 27 years. Her tombstone is the oldest still erected in New Jersey. Her tombstone reads: "Calm was her death, well ordered her life, a pious mother and a loving wife, her offspring six, of which 4 here do lie, their souls in heaven, wher's do rest on high". In 1875 her tombstone and remains were moved from a cemetery on State Street to Saint Peter's Episcopal Church Cemetery.

Rectors
 Edward Portlock (1698)
 John Brook (1704-1707)
 Edward Vaughn (1709-1711, 1714-1722)
 William Halliday (1711-1713)
 Rev. William Skinner (1722-1758), brother of Cortlandt Skinner
 Robert McKean (1763-1767)
 John Preston (1769-1777)
 Abraham Beach (1783-1784)
 John Hamilton Rowland (1784-1787)
 George Hartwell Spieren (1788-1790)
 Henry Van Dyke (1791-1793)
 Richard Channing Moore (1793-1803)
 Jasper Davis Jones (1804-1809)
 James Chapman (1809-1844)
 James Hamble Leacock (1845-1848)
 Horace Edgar Pratt (1849-1854)
Rev. Dr. Alexander Jones (1855-1871)
Albert Rhett Walker (1871-1877)
James Orlando Drumm (1977-1878)
Everard Patterson Miller (1879-1892)
James Leach Lancaster (1983-1914)
William Northey Jones (1914-1953)
Rev. Canon George H Boyd (1953-1976
Rev. J. Rodney Croes (1977-2008)
Rev. Dr. Anne-Marie Jeffery  (2011-2021)

Gallery

References

External links

Saint Peters Churchyard at Findagrave
 https://www.stpetersepiscopal.com/ Church website

Perth Amboy, New Jersey
Episcopal church buildings in New Jersey
National Register of Historic Places in Middlesex County, New Jersey
New Jersey Register of Historic Places
Churches on the National Register of Historic Places in New Jersey
Churches in Middlesex County, New Jersey
History of New Jersey
Religious organizations established in 1698
1698 establishments in New Jersey